Barton and Pooley Bridge is a civil parish in the Eden District, Cumbria, England. Before 1 April 2019 the parish was named Barton. It contains 37 buildings that are recorded in the National Heritage List for England. Of these, one is listed at Grade I, the highest of the three grades, two are at Grade II*, the middle grade, and the others are at Grade II, the lowest grade.  The parish is in the Lake District National Park.  It is mainly rural, it contains the village of Pooley Bridge, the hamlet of Barton and smaller settlements, and part of it extends along the east shore of Ullswater.  Most of the listed buildings are houses, farmhouses and farm buildings.  The other listed buildings include a church and structures in the churchyard, three boundary posts, and a limekiln.


Key

Buildings

References

Citations

Sources

Lists of listed buildings in Cumbria
Eden District